North Media is a Danish media group. It owns the distribution company FK Distribution, BoligPortal, Ofir, and Bekey.

History
Richard Bunck founded FK Distribution in 1965 and Søndagsavisen in 1978. The two companies were merged under the name Søndasavisen a-s in 1990 and the company was listed on the Copenhagen Stock Exchange in 1996 and changed its name to North Media in 2010. In October 2013, it acquired eight local newspapers in the Copenhagen area from Berlingske Media.

Activities
 North Media A/S

FK Distribution
 FK Distribution
 Minetilbud.dk
 Daily.dk

North Media Online
 BoligPortal.dk
 BostadsPortal.se
 Ofir.dk
 MatchWork.com

Bekey
 Bekey

Investments
 Lead Supply

References

External links
 Official website
 2013 Annual Report

1978 establishments in Denmark
Companies based in Gladsaxe Municipality
Mass media companies established in 1978
Mass media companies based in Copenhagen
Danish companies established in 1978